Michael Rowe (born 1960) is an American television writer, producer and comedian. He has written for Becker, The Nanny, Futurama, Paranormal Action Squad and Family Guy, as well as writing the episode of The PJs, "A Race to His Credit".

Filmography
As writer
Becker
"The Grand Gesture"
"Mr. and Mrs. Conception"
"Nightmare on Becker Street"

Family Guy
"Brian Swings and Sings"

Futurama
"Bend Her"
"Bender's Game" Part 3 with Eric Kaplan
"Proposition Infinity"
"The Futurama Holiday Spectacular"
"Fry am the Egg Man"
"The Butterjunk Effect"
"2-D Blacktop"

References

External links

21st-century American comedians
American television producers
American television writers
American male television writers
Living people
Place of birth missing (living people)
21st-century American screenwriters
1960 births
21st-century American male writers